The Fox Theatre is a live music venue in Boulder, Colorado.

Location
The Fox Theatre is located on "The Hill", a commercial, restaurant, and bar district in Boulder. The theatre is located on 13th Street next to the Tulagi's building.  The Fox is located across the street from the University of Colorado campus. The Theatre can seat just over 600 people, making for a cozy and intimate venue.

History

Before the Fox was a staple music venue, it served as the Rialto Theater, the Buffalo Dancing Club, the Anchorage Bar & Grill, Ted’s Buff Cafe, and most recently, The Fox Movie Theater. The movie theater opened in 1961 and could seat up to 500 movie goers. This format lasted till 1991 when a liquor license was acquired. Demolition of the Fox Movie Theater began in 1991 after a liquor license was acquired by the property owners. The demo began to uncover the roots of the building, dating back to 1926. The marquee sign and iconic Fox sign still on the building today are original from the movie theater era. The Fox Theatre first opened its doors to the public on March 6, 1992, with a performance from The Meters. 

On March 6, 2022, the Fox Theatre officially celebrated its 30th birthday. Governor Jared Polis declared March 6, 2022, as Fox Theatre 30th Anniversary Day.

Artists
Notable artists in the history of The Fox include: Mac Miller, GRiZ, YBN Nahmir Sublime, Dave Matthews Band, Adele, John Mayer, The Killers, Jack Johnson, The Fray, Sheryl Crow, Widespread Panic, Phish, Sugarcult, Lyle Lovett, Bonnie Raitt, Willie Nelson, Heavyweight Dub Champion, Snoop Dogg, Method Man, Umphrey's Mcgee, Wu Tang Clan, Hunter S. Thompson, Deadmau5, Fishbone, The Chainsmokers, Skrillex, Michael Kang, The Samples, the Mickey Hart Band and other members from String Cheese Incident, and many more.

The Fox has also hosted local acts including Air Dubai, The Fray, Yonder Mountain String Band, Leftover Salmon, Kyle Hollingsworth Band, The Drunken Hearts, West Water Outlaws, Jet Edison, The Magic Beans, Technicolor Tone Factory, Summa, Hot Soup, and many more.

References 

Cinemas and movie theaters in Colorado
Music venues in Colorado
Theatres in Colorado
Culture of Boulder, Colorado
Buildings and structures in Boulder, Colorado
Tourist attractions in Boulder, Colorado